Wolfstee is a railway station in Herentals, Antwerp, Belgium. The station opened in 2004 on the Line 15. The station was built to reduce the amount of car traffic heading to Antwerp while there was work completed on the Antwerp-Ring. The station bridge over the tracks was moved from Antwerpen-Berchem railway station to Wolfstee station.

Train services
The following services currently the serve the station:

S-train services (S33) Antwerp - Lier - Herentals - Mol (weekdays)

The station is closed at the weekend.

Bus services
The following bus services call at the station. They are operated by De Lijn.

159 (Herentals Industrie – Herentals)

References

External links
 Wolfstee railway station at Belgian Railways website

Railway stations opened in 2004
Railway stations in Belgium
Railway stations in Antwerp Province
Herentals